There were three Doges, and many other prominent Venetians, called Alvise Mocenigo. Alvise I Mocenigo (26 October 1507 – 4 June 1577) was doge of Venice from 1570 to 1577.

An admirer of antiquities, Mocenigo  was a diplomat of the Republic of Venice at the court of emperor Charles V (1545), to pope Paul IV (1557) and again at the imperial court (1564). In 1567 he was a candidate to the election as doge, but lost to Pietro Loredan. He participated again when the latter died, and was elected as doge of Venice in 1570. His dogaressa was the scholar Loredana Marcello (d. 1572).

At the time of his accession, the Ottoman Empire was preparing to wage war against Venice: the conflict broke out in 1570, and Venice lost  the fortresses of Nicosia and Famagusta in Cyprus. Despite the victory of the Christian coalition in the Battle of Lepanto, Venice was forced to sign an unfavorable treaty of peace with the Turks (7 March 1573), by which it recognized the loss of Cyprus.

During his reign Venice was visited by the new King of France, Henry III, in July 1574.

It was believed that Mocenigo was severely depressed towards the end of his life. He would be seen talking to the children of Venice, however with adults he would not.

Death
Alvise I Mocenigo died on November 27, 1577, of suicide by hanging. He was interred in the Basilica di San Giovanni e Paolo, a traditional burial place of the doges.

See also
Mocenigo family

References

1507 births
1577 deaths
Alvise
Republic of Venice people of the Ottoman–Venetian Wars
16th-century Doges of Venice
Burials at Santi Giovanni e Paolo, Venice